The 1974 New York Jets season was the fifteenth season for the team and the fifth in the National Football League. It began with the team trying to improve upon its 4–10 record from 1973 under new head coach Charley Winner. After beginning the season 1–7, the Jets won six straight and finished with a record of 7–7. During the streak were home upsets of playoff-bound Miami and Buffalo.

Offseason

Draft

Roster

Regular season

Schedule

Intra-division opponents are in bold text.

Standings

Season summary

Week 9 at Giants

Awards and honors
 Joe Namath, NFL Comeback Player of the Year

References

External links
1974 statistics

New York Jets seasons
New York Jets
New York Jets season
1970s in Queens